Hauser is an unincorporated community in Coos County, Oregon, United States. Hauser is on the edge of the Oregon Dunes National Recreation Area near North Slough, a tributary of Coos Bay once known as the North Inlet of Coos Bay. It is a station on the Central Oregon and Pacific Railroad (formerly the Southern Pacific).

Hauser was originally named "North Slough" but it was decided the name was unsuitable. It was renamed after Eric V. Hauser of Portland, who, with his sons, had a construction contract on the railroad in about 1914. Hauser is also the namesake of the library at Reed College in Portland and he once owned the Multnomah Hotel. Hauser post office ran from 1915 to 1957.

Charles D. McFarlin of Massachusetts built the first known cranberry bog on the West Coast in what is now Hauser in 1884.

References

Unincorporated communities in Coos County, Oregon
1915 establishments in Oregon
Unincorporated communities in Oregon